Kairali Airlines was a regional airline based in Trivandrum, India. It was founded on 9 January 2013 and inaugurated by 15 June 2013. It planned its inaugural flight between Trivandrum International Airport Limited (CIAL) and Cochin International Airport.

Its main hub was at Trivandrum International Airport in Trivandrum. It was a public limited company which planned to operate a non-scheduled domestic and international service, the Intrastate Air Taxi Service which is first in India.

Destinations 

1st phase

2nd phase

Fleet

External links
 www.kairaliairlines.com

References

Defunct airlines of India
Proposed airlines of India